Paired-like homeobox 2b (PHOX2B), also known as neuroblastoma Phox (NBPhox), is a protein that in humans is encoded by the PHOX2B gene located on chromosome 4.

It codes for a homeodomain transcription factor. It is expressed exclusively in the nervous system, in most neurons that control the viscera (cardiovascular, digestive and respiratory systems). It is also required for their differentiation.

Immunohistochemistry 
Essential for the differentiation and survival of sympathetic neurons and chromaffin cells, the transcription factor PHOX2B is highly specific for the peripheral autonomic nervous system. Neuroblasts are derived from sympathoadrenal lineage neural crest cells and therefore require and constitutively express PHOX2B. PHOX2B immunohistochemical staining, as a marker of neural crest derivation, has been shown to be sensitive and specific for undifferentiated neuroblastoma, enabling identification where other markers fail to recognize neuroblastoma among various different small round blue cell tumors of childhood.

The diagnostic utility of PHOX2B staining extends to later stages of differentiation. Its strength and specificity can detect the small foci of neuroblastic tumors metastatic to the bone marrow, an identification critical for determining disease staging. PHOX2B staining also overcomes frequent obstacles to neuroblastoma detection in post-treatment samples, which frequently exhibit dense fibrosis, prominent inflammatory infiltrates, and/or diffuse calcification.

Pathology 
Mutations in human PHOX2B cause a rare disease of the visceral nervous system (dysautonomia): congenital central hypoventilation syndrome (associated with respiratory arrests during sleep and, occasionally, wakefulness), Hirschsprung's disease (partial agenesis of the enteric nervous system), ROHHAD, and tumours of the sympathetic ganglia.
In most people, Exon 3 of the gene contains a sequence of 20 polyalanine repeats. An increase in the number of repeats is associated with congenital central hypoventilation syndrome. There may also be other pathogenic mutations further along the gene.

References

Further reading

External links 
 GeneReviews/NCBI/NIH/UW entry on Congenital Central Hypoventilation Syndrome
 

Transcription factors